Hardy Holzman Pfeiffer Associates' (HHPA) was an internationally recognized American architecture firm with offices in New York and Los Angeles.  Established by Hugh Hardy, Malcolm Holzman and Norman Pfeiffer in 1967 in New York, HHPA was noted for its innovative public buildings, and received over 100 national design awards, including the American Institute of Architects' Architecture Firm Award in 1981.  After the firm disbanded in August 2004, each of the partners established a successor firm.

Major projects
All buildings are in Manhattan, New York City unless otherwise indicated:

1971: Dance Theatre of Harlem, conversion from garage to dance theatre
1973: Columbus Occupational Health Association, now Cummins headquarters, Columbus, Indiana
1976: Cooper-Hewitt National Design Museum, conversion from mansion to museum
1982: Joyce Theatre, converted from movie theater to dance theatre
1985: Rizzoli Bookstore, restoration and remodeling of former Sohmer Piano showroom
1987: Brooklyn Academy of Music Harvey Theater, renovation, Brooklyn, New York City
1988: Alaska Center for the Performing Arts, Anchorage, Alaska
1994: Everett Center Dance Theatre of Harlem, new building
1995: New Victory Theater, restoration and remodeling
1996: B. Altman and Company Building Fifth Avenue, exterior restoration
1996: St. Jean Baptiste Roman Catholic Church, restoration
1997: New Amsterdam Theater, restoration
1997: Look Building 488 Madison Avenue, renovation
1998: Vivian Beaumont Theatre, lobby remodeled
1999: Radio City Music Hall, interior renovation
2000: Central Synagogue (Congregation Ahavath Chesed), restoration
2004: Marie P. DeBartolo Performing Arts Center, Notre Dame, Indiana, 2004
Source:

References
Notes

External links

Successor firms
H3 Hardy Collaboration Architecture
Holzman Moss Bottino Architecture
Pfeiffer Partners Architects

Defunct architecture firms based in New York City